Garden Reach is a neighbourhood of Kolkata city in West Bengal, India. It is situated in the south-western part of Kolkata near the bank of the Hooghly River. It is located to the north-east of Maheshtala, the west of Kidderpore and the north of Taratala and Behala. Localities within Garden Reach include Metiabruz, BNR Colony, Bartala, Bandhabartala, Badartala and Rajabagan.

History

Nawab Wajid Ali Shah in exile

This area is connected to the history of Nawab Wajid Ali Shah, fifth King of Oudh, who after being ousted by the East India Company, made Garden Reach his refuge. Accompanied by his close relatives, musicians, cooks and animals from his menagerie, he came ashore at Bichali Ghat near Metiabruz on 13 May 1856. A year later when the Indian Rebellion of 1857 spread to Lucknow and the rebelling sepoys installed one of his sons to the throne of Awadh, Wajid Ali Shah was imprisoned in Fort William by the East India Company along with his Prime Minister, due to the fear that he could become a rallying figure for the rebellion. H.E.A. Cotton wrote that "on Panic Sunday (June 14, 1857), there was wide spread apprehension among the white inhabitants of Kolkata because he had one, two, three thousand (no one knew) armed men under him". After his release from Fort William, he was "allotted" a building called BNR House, in Garden Reach-BNR Colony area, now a part of headquarters of South-Eastern Railway, Kolkata.

Heartbroken after leaving Lucknow, he tried to carve out a miniature of Lucknow in Metiabruz. In his exile in Metiabruz, he tried to keep the sweet memories of his Lucknow era alive by recreating the musical environments of his Kaisarbagh Baradari. The king spent his life lavishly out of his income of 12 lakhs (i.e., 1.2 million) rupees per annum and a "second Lucknow" arose in this area. The Imambaras he created stands at the centre of Matiaburj.

Surinaam Ghat
Owned by the Port Trust of India this Ghat is situated at the eastern bank of Hooghly river near Kolkata Port. It is named after the South American Caribbean country Suriname commemorating the indentured migration of Indian workers from this ghat to that country. A total of 64 sailing ships carried 34,300 workers to the country from 1873 to 1917. Suriname ghat is also popularly known as Balu Ghat.

In the Honour of Indian indentured workers who had migrated to Suriname, an aluminium statue of  a plainly-dressed couple carrying a potli which symbolizes the first Indian man and woman to set foot on Suriname was set up as a memorial. It was unveiled by Union External Affairs Minister Sushma Swaraj on 7 October 2015. The statue is a replica of the Baba and Mai monument in Paramaribo, Suriname's capital and is gifted by the government of Suriname.

Economy

Industry
Some of the major industries in the Garden Reach area are:
Garden Reach Shipbuilders and Engineers - the premier warship building company in India, under the administrative control of Ministry of Defence.
ITC Ltd., Garden Reach, the Kolkata-based largest cigarette manufacturer in India, which has diversified into Fast-Moving Consumer Goods (FMCG), hotels etc.
Paharpur Cooling Towers Ltd., Garden Reach, pioneers and leader in cooling towers.
 General Electricals Co. Ltd., Paharpur, Kolkata.
 Hindustan Unilever, Garden Reach, consumer goods company.
 Britania Biscuit Co. Ltd., Hide Road, Kolkata. 
 Balmer Lawrie & Co Ltd., Hide Road, Kolkata.
 Videocon Glass and Appliances Factory
 CESC Limited
 Danieli 
 A bottling plant unit of Indian Oil Corporation. 
 Hindustan Petroleum
 Ready-made Garments Manufacturer

Road transport
Transport system of Garden Reach has been improved. Although traffic jam occurs at late night after 11pm. Garden Reach Flyover, which connects Garden Reach with Majherhat, helps in smooth transportation of vehicles. The port area is congested primarily because of the trailers. However, people of Garden Reach are now using this flyover from brook lane in the Garden Reach area to reach Diamond Harbour Road easily. The foundation stone of the flyover was laid on 1 March 2014, after being approved by Central Government. Its estimated project cost is of Rs 313.27 crore. The project was completed in 2018.

Hospitals
Garden Reach Maternity Hospital.
Garden Reach State General Hospital.
Unipon Hospital.
S.E Railway central Hospital
Metiabruz Super-Speciality Hospital
Susrut Eye Foundation

Notable people
Biman Banerjee – Speakers of the West Bengal Legislative Assembly

Educational institutions

Government schools:
 Badartala High School
 Bartala Library School
 Nadial Ucchobidhyalaya
 Metiabruz High School 
 Bengali Bazar High School
 Garden Reach Maulana Azad High School
 Maulana Hasrat Mohani Memorial Girls High School 
 Garden Reach Mudiali High School
 Garden Reach Mudiali Girl's High School
 Garden Reach Nut Behari Das Boy's High School
 Garden Reach Nut Behari Das Girl's High School
 Kendriya Vidyalaya Garden Reach
 Arya Parishad Vidyalaya
 Santoshpur Shyama Prasad Vidyalaya For Girls
 Garden Reach Kesoram Cotton Mills High School

Private schools:
 All Saints High School
 St Mathew School
 Dar Al-Arqam International School
 P.A.J's English Day School
 St. Jacob's High School
 The Study Park
 Guru Nanak Modern School
 Mali Sofiuddin Memorial School
 Sir Syed Ahmed Free Primary School (Urdu)
 Little Steps School (Ashoka Hall Group)
 Crescent Public School (English Medium)
Madrasa School
Badartala High Madrasa

Colleges:
 Harimohan Ghose College
 Matiaburj College
 Panchur College

Police station
The area is served by the Garden Reach police, Metiabruz police, Nadial Police, Rajabagan police, Rabindranagar Police

Crimes

 On 11 February 2013 a police officer, Tapas Choudhury, was shot dead as members of the students' wings of Indian National Congress and Trinamool Congress violently clashed at Harimohan Ghose College while filling the nomination papers for the students' union election. Four students were injured in the violence.
 On 18 March 1984 during a clash between residents, a mob clashed with the police and the police fired several rounds. As a result, a deputy commissioner, Vinod Mehta, and his bodyguard, Mokhtar Ali, were killed by anti-socials.

References 

Neighbourhoods in Kolkata